The Arauco Basin is a sediment-filled depression –a sedimentary basin– in south-central Chile. In the context of plate tectonics it is classified as a forearc basin. The basin is interpreted as being part of an uplifted part of the continental shelf. To the west it bounds an active accretionary prism that lies next to the Chile trench and to the east it bounds metamorphic basement representing a fossil Paleozoic accretionary complex that has been intruded by the Coastal Batholith of central Chile.

Traditionally the centre of coal mining in Chile, large-scale coal mining in Arauco Basin ended in the 1990s. Given a high density of geological faults that have displaced the coal beds and the thin nature of these (less than one metre) mining activity in Arauco Basin has proven difficult to mechanize.

Stratigraphy 
The sedimentary fill has a maximum thickness of ca. . Parts of the basin are on land in Arauco Peninsula where Eocene coal-bearing rocks of marine and continental origin and Eocene age are exposed. On top of these rocks and toward the centre of the peninsula Miocene and Pliocene sedimentary rocks exists. Towards the east Cretaceous sedimentary rocks crop out.
The sedimentary formations defined in Arauco Basin include:

Pliocene Tubul Formation is the oldest formation in the basin that has not been folded. It lies on an unconformity that cuts across all other formations of the basin. The base of the Ranquil Formation is the so-called “main unconformity” which is thought to have formed by erosion during a period of tectonic inversion.

Tectonic evolution 
A three-stage model of evolution has been proposed for the Arauco Basin. First a phase of extension in the Late Cretaceous and Paleogene. Then a basin inversion lasting from the Middle Eocene to the Miocene causing the uplift and erosion that created the “main unconformity” and finally a post-inversion phase of strike-slip faulting  in the Pliocene and Pleistocene. The subduction of the Mocha Fracture Zone under the basin that begun about 3.6 million years ago is believed to have caused the uplift of the basin plus some further tectonic inversion and contraction.

See also 

 Caldera Basin
 Cura-Mallín Basin
 Magallanes Basin

Notes

References 

Forearc basins
Sedimentary basins of Chile
Geology of Biobío Region
Coasts of Biobío Region